Eom Su-yeon (born 1 February 2001) is a South Korean ice hockey player and member of the South Korean national team,  playing with the St. Lawrence Saints women's ice hockey program in the ECAC Hockey conference of NCAA Division I.

Career

Korean National Team 
She competed in the 2018 Winter Olympics as part of a unified team of 35 players drawn from both North and South Korea. The team's coach was Sarah Murray and the team was in Group B competing against Switzerland, Japan and Sweden.

In 2019, she was a member of the inaugural South Korean Women's U18 team that participated in the 2019 IIHF World Women%27s U18 Championship in the Group 1B Qualification Tournament. The South Korean team went undefeated en route to winning the gold medal and Eom was named Best Defender of the tournament.

NCAA 

Eom began her college ice hockey career with the St. Lawrence Saints women's ice hockey program in the 2021–22 season. After making a midseason switch from playing defence to forward, she scored her first collegiate goal on 4 February 2022 in a 3–0 victory against Princeton University.

References

External links
 
 

2001 births
Living people
Expatriate ice hockey players in the United States
Ice hockey players at the 2016 Winter Youth Olympics
Ice hockey players at the 2017 Asian Winter Games
Ice hockey players at the 2018 Winter Olympics
Olympic ice hockey players of South Korea
South Korean expatriate sportspeople in the United States
South Korean women's ice hockey defencemen
St. Lawrence Saints women's ice hockey players
Winter Olympics competitors for Korea